The 1964 season of the Peruvian Primera División, the top category of Peruvian football, was played by 10 teams. The national champions were Universitario. At the end of the regular season (home and away matches) teams were split in 2 groups of 5 teams: top 5 played for the title and bottom 5 played for the relegation. Teams carried their regular season records and played an additional round (4 further matches).

Results

First stage

Final group

Relegation group

External links 
 Peru 1964 season at RSSSF

Peru1
1964 in Peruvian football
Peruvian Primera División seasons